The 23rd Luna Awards were held on May 14, 2005 at The Westin Philippine Plaza and they honored the best Filipino films of the year 2004. This is the first time that "Luna" was used as the name of the awards. The new voting process was also fully implemented.

The nominees were announced on April 14, 2005. Santa Santita received the most nominations with nine. It was followed by Aishite Imasu 1941: Mahal Kita, Milan and Panaghoy sa Suba with eight.

Aishite Imasu 1941: Mahal Kita gained most of the awards with six awards, including the Best Picture. Dennis Trillo was originally placed in the Best Supporting Actor category but it was moved to the Best Actor, just like what Star Awards for Movies did. The Director General's Ball was held in the Grand Plaza Ballroom right after the awards ceremony.

The awards ceremony was criticized for number of reasons. It was criticized for starting late from its original schedule and the loot bags were only given to the winners of the major categories, ignoring the winners of the technical categories. Before the last three segments of the ceremony, the audience were instructed to go outside to see the fireworks display. This led to an almost-empty venue when Regine Velasquez sang and Joel Lamangan and Lily Monteverde gave their acceptance speeches, after winning Best Director and Best Picture, respectively. Despite being an industry affair, some movie workers were denied entry to the ceremony. This also occurred to some of the press people.

Winners and nominees

Special award

Cyber Choice Awards
The Cyber Choice Awards were also given with the winners getting certificates. It also used the new voting process. The winners of these awards are not considered as part of the official results.

Multiple nominations and awards

References

External links
 Official Website of the Film Academy of the Philippines

Luna Awards
2004 film awards
2005 in Philippine cinema